Kinderwhore was a clothing style used by a handful of mostly female grunge bands in the US during the early to mid-1990s. The kinderwhore look consisted of torn, ripped tight or low-cut babydoll and Peter-Pan-collared dresses, slips, knee-socks, heavy makeup with dark eyeliner, barrettes, and leather boots or Mary Jane shoes.

Mish Way described it as "intentionally taking the most constraining parts of the feminine, good-girl aesthetic, inflating them to a cartoon level, and subverting them to kill any ingrained insecurities." She further noted that although the look was very feminine, when its exponents performed onstage they "stood tall and confident, they threw their guitars around like weapons, and screamed out whip-smart feminist lyrics. These women were questioning the cultural importance of typical beauty through costume and the stage."

History 
The origin of kinderwhore is uncertain. It is believed that Kat Bjelland of Babes in Toyland was the first to wear the look, and to define it, while her former roommate Courtney Love of Hole was the first to popularize it. The term was coined by Melody Maker journalist Everett True. Interviewed in 1994, Love commented;

Love has claimed that she took the style from Divinyls frontwoman Christine Amphlett, and was also inspired by KatieJane Garside of Daisy Chainsaw who toured with Hole during 1991. The look became very popular in 1994.

Impact 
In 2019 designer Batsheva Hay cited Courtney Love's "kinderwhore aesthetic" as inspiration. Hay said Love's look "was so of that time but she was also so ahead of her time".

A 2020 novel by the English author Guy Mankowski, entitled "Dead Rock Stars", apparently depicts a fictional Kinderwhore band called 'Cherub', whose lead singer Emma draws from the Kinderwhore aesthetic of 'Hollywood glamour of tiaras and satin dresses... with a twisted, girlish sensibility.' Mankowski added, 'I was influenced by the urge that such artists had to use their body to offer a message, with them making the very most of the textual space that comes with being in a band.'

See also 
 Heroin chic
 Soft grunge

References 

1990s fashion
Punk fashion
Grunge
Women in punk